The Mayor of Frosinone is an elected politician who, along with the Frosinone's City Council, is accountable for the strategic government of Frosinone in Lazio, Italy. The current Mayor is Riccardo Mastrangeli, a member of Forza Italia, who took office on 29 June 2022.

Overview
According to the Italian Constitution, the Mayor of Frosinone is member of the City Council.

The Mayor is elected by the population of Frosinone, who also elects the members of the City Council, controlling the Mayor's policy guidelines and is able to enforce his resignation by a motion of no confidence. The Mayor is entitled to appoint and release the members of his government.

Since 1993 the Mayor is elected directly by Frosinone's electorate: in all mayoral elections in Italy in cities with a population higher than 15,000 the voters express a direct choice for the mayor or an indirect choice voting for the party of the candidate's coalition. If no candidate receives at least 50% of votes, the top two candidates go to a second round after two weeks. The election of the City Council is based on a direct choice for the candidate with a preference vote: the candidate with the majority of the preferences is elected. The number of the seats for each party is determined proportionally.

Kingdom of Italy (1870–1946) 
The Papal States were annexed to the Kingdom of Italy in 1870 and the first mayor of Frosinone (sindaco di Frosinone), Domenico Diamanti, was appointed by King Victor Emmanuel II in January 1871. From 1889 to 1926 the Mayor was elected by the City council. In 1926, the Fascist dictatorship abolished mayors and City councils, replacing them with an authoritarian Podestà chosen by the National Fascist Party. The office of Mayor was restored in 1944 during the Allied occupation.

Italian Republic (since 1946)

City Council election (1946-1995)
From 1946 to 1995, the Mayor of Frosinone was elected by the City's Council.

Direct election (since 1995)
Since 1995, under provisions of new local administration law, the Mayor of Frosinone is chosen by direct election.

Timeline

References

Bibliography

External links

Frosinone
 
Politics of Lazio
Frosinone